Christophe Pinna is a member of the French National Karate team. He is a multi-time World Champion (WKF). He is known for his roundhouse kicks.

Accolades 
3x Champion of the Europe Individual OPEN (1995 - 1996 - 1997)  
1x Champion of Individual World OPEN (2000)  
3x Champion of the Europe You equip (1993 - 1995 - 1997)  
2x Winning of the Goblet of the World (1993 - 1997)  
1x Winning of the Mediterranean Games (1992)  
3x Champion of the MundoEquipas (1994 - 1996 - 1998)

References

1968 births
Living people
Sportspeople from Nice
French male karateka
20th-century French people
21st-century French people